Jeffrey Jude Kenna (born 27 August 1970) is an Irish football manager and former professional footballer.

He played as a defender from 1989 until 2009, notably in the Premier League for Southampton, Blackburn Rovers and Birmingham City. He was part of the Rovers side that won the title in 1995 following his mid-season transfer from the Saints. He also played in the Football League for Tranmere Rovers, Wigan Athletic and Derby County, finishing his career in England with Non-league side Kidderminster Harriers. He was capped 27 times by Republic of Ireland.

Following retirement he went on to manage Galway United and St Patrick's Athletic. In 2011, he joined the coaching staff of the IMG Academy in Bradenton, Florida.

Playing career
Kenna was born in Dublin, but began his club career in England, with Southampton in 1988. He made his debut on 4 May 1991 in a 6–2 league defeat by Derby County at the Baseball Ground. He became a first team regular in the 1992–93 season and remained a fixture in the first team until 15 March 1995, when he moved to Blackburn Rovers for a fee of £1.5 million, playing a part in the run-in to the club's Premier League title that year.

He had played 114 league matches for the Saints, scoring four goals.

He was a regular in the Blackburn team until the 1999–2000 season, after Blackburn had been relegated to Division One. He made his final six appearances for Rovers in the 2000–01 season. During that campaign he had loan spells with Tranmere Rovers and Wigan Athletic, before finally exiting Ewood Park after nearly seven years to join Birmingham City on a free transfer on 24 December 2001.

Kenna scored three goals for Birmingham City after their promotion to the Premier League as Division One playoff winners at the end of the 2001–02 season – their first top division campaign in nearly 20 years.

He joined Derby County on a free transfer in March 2004, and was appointed club captain 2005, but was released at the end of the season in May 2006. In August 2006 he sealed a move to Kidderminster Harriers in the Conference National. Along with Steve Guppy, he became the first player to play at both Wembley stadiums, having played twice at the old ground, when he played for Kidderminster in their defeat to Stevenage in the FA Trophy Final 2007.

Coaching career
Kenna was named Galway United manager (taking over from his former Republic of Ireland U21 international team-mate Tony Cousins) in a press conference on 21 April 2008. He lost his first match in charge 3–2 versus Bray Wanderers.

At the time taking over at United, the club were bottom of the table and haemorrhaging money. Due to league financial regulations a lot of the senior players were sold onto other clubs to ensure that the clubs salary expenditure fell within league requirements. On 15 July 2008, Kenna officially (albeit somewhat reluctantly) became player-manager at Galway United.

Galway were forced to rely on a lot of young inexperienced players, but as the season drew to a climax Kenna engendered a real team spirit in the side to the extent that over the last seven games United collected five wins, a draw and one loss. This enabled Galway to garner seventeen crucial points and narrowly avoid relegation to the First Division, pipping Finn Harps by a single point.. A wonderful feather in the cap of this fledgeling manager (he had also led the club to the last four of both the League Cup and the FAI Cup), Kenna was understood to be contracted for another season with Galway but decided to quit during the winter period.

He took the position of St. Patricks' Athletic manager on 15 January 2009. His first competitive match was a 3–0 home defeat at the hands of his previous club whose new manager, Ian Foster, had been Kenna's assistant the season before. Indifferent league form (which included two more defeats at the hands of Galway) combined with the fact that he was commuting between Dublin and the UK saw Kenna come under pressure from the St. Pat's fans quite quickly, but a run to the Fourth Qualifying Round of the Europa League (which included a victory over Russian side Krylia Sovetov) appeared to have
weathered the storm.

However, a 2–0 loss at home to First Division Waterford United in the quarter final of the FAI Cup ultimately led to Kenna's resignation as St. Patrick's Athletic manager on 18 September 2009.

On 1 August 2011, Kenna joined the coaching staff at the IMG Academy in Bradenton, Florida.

Personal life
Kenna is the brother of heavyweight boxer Colin Kenna and second cousin of football manager Pat Scully. His father Liam is an Irish former snooker international. Since his days at Birmingham City Kenna's family had been settled in the West Midlands and he commuted to Ireland for training activities.

Career statistics

Club

International

Managerial

Honours
Blackburn Rovers
 Premier League: 1994–95

Southampton
Full Members Cup finalist: 1992

References

External links

Republic of Ireland profile

1970 births
Association footballers from Dublin (city)
Southampton F.C. players
Blackburn Rovers F.C. players
Tranmere Rovers F.C. players
Wigan Athletic F.C. players
Birmingham City F.C. players
Derby County F.C. players
Kidderminster Harriers F.C. players
Premier League players
English Football League players
National League (English football) players
Republic of Ireland association footballers
Republic of Ireland international footballers
Republic of Ireland under-21 international footballers
Republic of Ireland B international footballers
League of Ireland managers
Galway United F.C. players
St Patrick's Athletic F.C. managers
Living people
Galway United F.C. managers
Association football defenders
Republic of Ireland football managers